Marcel Pannekoek (born 3 May 1986) is a Dutch footballer who plays as a midfielder for VV Winsum in the Eerste Klasse.

Pannekoek emerged as a talent from the FC Groningen youth academy in 2005, but did not manage to make his breakthrough for the first team. After a two-year stint with Eerste Divisie club Emmen, he moved to Hoofdklasse club PKC '83 in June 2009 where he would play while studying in Groningen.

In March 2011, it was announced that Pannekoek would move up a division, as he signed with third-tier club Harkemase Boys. After one season, he left after suffering a series of injuries. He joined his childhood club VIBOA afterwards, while taking over his father's jewellery store, Juwelier Pannekoek in Winsum, together with his sister Annemiek. In 2016, he continued with VV Winssum after VIBOA has merged with Hunsingo, and continued playing in the Eerste Klasse.

References

External links
Profile at Voetbal International

1986 births
People from Winsum
Living people
Dutch footballers
Association football midfielders
FC Groningen players
FC Emmen players
Eredivisie players
Eerste Divisie players
Derde Divisie players
Eerste Klasse players
Harkemase Boys players
Dutch jewellers
Footballers from Groningen (province)